Dimitrios Zakharias (born 1910, date of death unknown) was a Greek wrestler. He competed in the men's Greco-Roman welterweight at the 1936 Summer Olympics.

References

External links
 

1910 births
Year of death missing
Greek male sport wrestlers
Olympic wrestlers of Greece
Wrestlers at the 1936 Summer Olympics
Place of birth missing
20th-century Greek people